"Come Back Home" is a song recorded by South Korean girl group 2NE1 for their second and final Korean-language studio album, Crush (2014). The song was released on February 27, 2014, through YG Entertainment in conjunction with the release of the album and serves as one of its two title tracks. Written and produced by Teddy Park along with Choi Pil-kang and Dee.P, the song is a hybrid of a variety of musical genres, including electropop, R&B, reggae and trap. An unplugged version of the single was also made available on the album.

The song received generally positive reviews from music critics, who complimented its musical style and production. 2NE1 received several accolades for "Come Back Home", including Song of the Year – March at the 3rd Gaon Chart K-Pop Awards and Best Electronic Song at the 2014 Melon Music Awards. The song maintained the top position on the Gaon Digital Chart for two consecutive weeks, and sold nearly 1,300,000 digital units in the country by the end of 2014.

The music video for the song, directed by Dee Shin, was released on March 2, 2014, and was noted for its high production value and use of computer-generated imagery. The video, reminiscent of the film The Matrix (1999), incorporates an array of dystopian and futuristic elements intertwined with the concept of a virtual paradise. To promote the song, 2NE1 appeared on Inkigayo and M Countdown throughout March 2014, and included the song on the setlist for their AON: All Or Nothing World Tour.

Background and release
Following the success of 2NE1's debut studio-album To Anyone in 2010, there had been much speculation and several announcements in regards to their then-upcoming second full-length Korean-language album. Prior to the release of the group's 2012 single "I Love You", YG Entertainment CEO Yang Hyun-suk announced that he intended for them to release a new single every three weeks eventually leading up to a new album. One year later in June 2013, however, Yang once again unveiled plans for the promotion of a series of songs leading up to a new album that October. It was only until February 13, 2014, when YG officially confirmed via YG Life the release of 2NE1's second Korean-language studio album, titled Crush, for February 24. The agency announced that the full-length album would instead consist of 10 new tracks, with the exception of the Korean version of their Japanese single "Scream" (2012).

On February 19, 2014, it was announced that the release of the album would be postponed to two days later than originally intended, in order to coincide with the birthday of CL on the 26th. At the same time, the tracklist for the album was unveiled, and it was announced that "Come Back Home" would serve as one of the two title tracks, alongside "Gotta Be You". The name of the track sparked curiosity among fans due to Yang's former group Seo Taiji and Boys having a song of the same name. In an interview with Vice, 2NE1 leader CL confirmed that the name of the song was in fact intended to pay homage to the former group, although the music video concept would remain different. Both Crush and "Come Back Home" were released as planned at midnight local time on February 27, 2014, with the song being made available for digital consumption in various countries. An acoustic "unplugged" version of the song was recorded and was also included on the album.

Composition and lyrics

"Come Back Home" was written and produced by long time YG-collaborator Teddy Park, with additional composition and arrangement both being handled by the duo Choi Pil-kang and Dee.P of Future Bounce. Musically, "Come Back Home" consists of a diverse and contrasting range of musical styles, with the most predominant genres being electropop, R&B, and hip-hop. The genre-bending electro-reggae-acoustic-EDM-hybrid has been characterized as a crossover dance number, integrating both modern and retro musical elements—such as Atlanta trap drums and pop-reggae guitars. Dazed commented that the reggae-tinged deep electronica track was reminiscent of the group's previous hits such as "I Love You" and "Falling in Love" (2013). Writing for Billboard magazine, Jeff Benjamin referred to the song as a reggae-trap hybrid that mashes the two distinct genres into a "booming final product". "Opening with a bouncy beat similar to Rihanna's 'Man Down'", Benjamin wrote, "the girls croon about losing a lover, asking him to 'come back home' until the production flips into a heavy trap beat. At that point, the girls get seductive and demand their love to 'come, baby baby, come, baby baby.'"

Critical reception
"Come Back Home" was met with generally positive reviews from music critics. Kim Young-jin from domestic webzine Weiv noted its incorporation of American pop and hip-hop styles with "advanced contemporary trends", and said that "'Come Back Home' once again confirms the direction and capabilities of YG Entertainment, not just 2NE1." Writing for PopMatters, Scott Interrante ranked "Come Back Home" number 11 on their list of The Best K-pop of 2014, hailing the track as an "incredible pop song". Referring to it as an earworm, Corban Goble of Pitchfork selected the song as one of the standout tracks from Crush. On their list of Top 20 K-pop Tracks of 2014, Taylor Glasby of Dazed ranked the song at number 6, lauding the "electro dystopia" track as a key work in the year's creative overload. Glasby further praised the song's musical styles and production, writing that 2NE1 does the "sound better than anyone else, managing the surging tempo changes with ease and retaining their fierceness despite the song’s relative calm". August Brown of the Los Angeles Times commented that "'Come Back Home' tosses Atlanta trap drums, pop-reggae guitars and Robyn's bleary-eyed pleading into one song and makes it work". Jeff Benjamin of Billboard additionally ranked the song the seventh best single of the group's discography in January 2017.

Commercial performance
Commercially, "Come Back Home" experienced success in South Korea. In its opening week, the song entered the Gaon Digital Chart at number two, placing just behind Girls' Generation's "Mr.Mr". In only four days of tracking, the song accumulated 2,758,049 streams and 276,288 units in digital sales, making it the week's second best-selling song. "Come Back Home" rose to the top position on the digital chart the following week, becoming the group's ninth and final number-one single in the country—extending their record at the time for the most number one songs out of any lead artist. It would stay atop the chart for an additional week, before descending to number three. The track sold a cumulative total of 547,474 digital units in addition to garnering 19,255,908 streams in the month of March, and ranked as the month's best performing single. By the end of the year, "Come Back Home" was placed at number 23 on the year-end Gaon Digital Chart and was ranked as the 12th best-selling single in the country, selling a total of 1,294,905 digital units. In addition, the song peaked at number four on the US World Digital Song Sales, becoming 2NE1's ninth top-five single on the chart. On the K-pop Hot 100, the song peaked at number two, and stayed within the top 10 for 9 weeks, becoming one of the longest songs to do so on the Korean Billboard chart.

Accolades

Music video

The music video for the song, directed by Dee Shin, was uploaded to 2NE1's YouTube channel on March 2, 2014. Yang Hyun-suk described the music video as "set in a near-future city", with the concept revolving around the notion that people in the said era prefer the virtual world over the real one, similar to the movie The Matrix (1999). With the increasing focus and reliance of technology, the theme of the music video attempts to convey the "importance and humanity of reality". In addition, Yang commented that, "Up to now, 2NE1 has filmed a lot of music videos mainly showcasing the song's choreography, but this time I wanted to try new things."  In the computer generated graphics-heavy visual, the group is seen living in a futuristic world where one can escape reality and enter a "virtual paradise" with a special machine. The dystopian-like real world features a normal girl (played by Dara) whose boyfriend is addicted to the virtual paradise and would rather be in the fantasy environment than with her. As a result, all four members go from their real world and transform into warrior rebels to infiltrate the virtual environment in order to destroy it from the inside. Filled with elaborate sets, special effects, and unique wardrobes, the video garnered notability for its high production value of half a million dollars to effectively exude a futuristic atmosphere, and has been compared to the likes of science fiction movies.

Following the music video's release, Joseph R. Atilano of the Inquirer wrote that the "video for 'Come Back Home' is a visual feast and showcases why K-pop groups like 2NE1 currently have a strong and sizable following from around the world". Popdust commented, "'Come Back Home' is laced with giffable special effects and bonkers CGI, all of which work perfectly against the genre-bending electro-reggae-acoustic-EDM-hybrid song." An additional music video for the unplugged version of the song was initially announced alongside the original video; however, it was never released.

Promotion and live performances
In order to promote "Come Back Home", 2NE1 appeared on the music programs SBS's Inkigayo and Mnet's M Countdown throughout March 2014. The group made the song's televised debut on Inkigayo and March 9, and subsequently appeared on M Countdown for the first time on March 13. The track was choreographed by Yang Hyun-suk, incorporating elements from the choreography of the popular 1995 track of the same name by Seo Taiji and Boys. According to YG insiders, the members of 2NE1 specifically requested for Yang himself to create the choreography for the song, as they felt that the elements from Seo Taiji and Boys would also suit the color of 2NE1's new performances. To further promote the single and the album internationally, the group kicked off their third concert tour AON: All Or Nothing at SK Olympic Handball Gymnasium in Seoul on March 1 and 2, 2014. The tour spanned from March to October 2014 and saw 20 shows in 16 different cities across Asia. A live album from the concerts in Seoul was released on May 23, 2014.

On the same day, 2NE1 made an appearance on You Hee-yeol's Sketchbook where they performed the unplugged version of the song live in order to commemorate the Sewol ferry disaster that occurred a month prior on April 16. In the performance, each of the group members are seen bearing a yellow ribbon—which served as a symbol of remembrance and sympathy for the lives lost in the sinking. The stage was met with positive reception amongst netizens, who applauded 2NE1's emotional delivery and the atmosphere of the performance, further commenting "I got live goose bumps" as well as "the song and lyrics of 'Come Back Home' are really comforting".

Credits and personnel 
Credits adapted from Melon.

Recording
 Recorded at YG Studio, Mapo-gu, Seoul

Personnel
 2NE1vocals, background vocals
 Teddy Parklyricist, composer, arranger
 Future Bounce
 Choi Pil-kang (P.K.)composer, arranger
 Dee.Pcomposer, arranger
 Dee Shinmusic video director

Charts

Weekly charts

Monthly charts

Year-end charts

Release history

See also 
 List of most expensive music videos

References

2014 songs
2NE1 songs
Korean-language songs
Songs written by Teddy Park
Gaon Digital Chart number-one singles
2014 singles
Trap music (EDM) songs
Electronic dance music songs